Northeast Itasca is an unorganized territory in Itasca County, Minnesota, United States. The population was 1,179 at the 2010 census.

Geography
According to the United States Census Bureau, the unorganized territory has a total area of 424.8 square miles (1,100.2 km2), of which 399.0 square miles (1,033.4 km2) is land and 25.8 square miles (66.7 km2), or 6.07%, is water.

Demographics
At the 2000 census there were 1,170 people, 488 households, and 359 families living in the unorganized territory.  The population density was 2.9 people per square mile (1.1/km2).  There were 1,509 housing units at an average density of 3.8/sq mi (1.5/km2).  The racial makeup of the unorganized territory was 96.92% White, 0.34% Black or African American, 1.37% Native American, 0.17% from other races, and 1.20% from two or more races. Hispanic or Latino of any race were 0.68%.

Of the 488 households 20.3% had children under the age of 18 living with them, 67.4% were married couples living together, 2.9% had a female householder with no husband present, and 26.4% were non-families. 23.2% of households were one person and 8.6% were one person aged 65 or older.  The average household size was 2.28 and the average family size was 2.66.

The age distribution was 22.5% under the age of 18, 5.6% from 18 to 24, 21.6% from 25 to 44, 31.4% from 45 to 64, and 18.9% 65 or older.  The median age was 45 years. For every 100 females, there were 121.2 males.  For every 100 females age 18 and over, there were 119.1 males.

The median household income was $40,583 and the median family income  was $43,565. Males had a median income of $35,104 versus $20,977 for females. The per capita income for the unorganized territory was $18,624.  About 5.3% of families and 6.4% of the population were below the poverty line, including 13.5% of those under age 18 and 3.5% of those age 65 or over.

References

Populated places in Itasca County, Minnesota
Unorganized territories in Minnesota